Birdgirl is an American adult animated superhero comedy television series. It is a spin-off of the television series Harvey Birdman, Attorney at Law created by Michael Ouweleen and Erik Richter, which itself was a comedic spin-off of the original 1967 Birdman cartoon and Space Ghost Coast to Coast. The series stars the voices of Paget Brewster, Rob Delaney, Sonia Denis, Kether Donohue, John Doman, Negin Farsad, Tony Hale and River L. Ramirez. The series premiered on Adult Swim on April 5, 2021. Unlike in the original Birdman cartoon, the Hanna-Barbera-owned characters—including Birdman himself—are missing from the series. 

On October 4, 2021, Kether Donohue, the voice of Gillian, posted on Instagram that Birdgirl had been renewed for a second season. This was confirmed on February 9, 2022. The second season premiered on Adult Swim on June 19, 2022 and HBO Max on June 20.

Plot
Judy Ken Sebben, the daughter of Phil Ken Sebben, fights crime as Birdgirl. When Phil Ken Sebben is killed in an accident, he names Birdgirl as the successor of Sebben & Sebben Worldwide. With help from her friend Meredith the Mind Taker, Birdgirl was able to get Judy to be the new CEO of Sebben & Sebben while still fighting crime on the side. In undoing the crimes her own father committed and combating other emerging threats of rivals while trying to balancing between running the company and continuing her life as a superhero, Judy is aided by the Birdteam, an all-new crack team she forms with Meredith and other Sebben & Sebben Worldwide employees.

Characters

 Judy Ken Sebben/Birdgirl (voiced by Paget Brewster) – The daughter of Phil Ken Sebben. She lives a double life as the superheroine Birdgirl. When Phil apparently died, Judy became the new CEO of Sebben & Sebben Worldwide.
 Meredith the Mind Taker (voiced by Negin Farsad) – The general manager of Sebben & Sebben Worldwide who is the best friend of Judy with mind-taking abilities.
 Gillian Sans (voiced by Kether Donohue) – Judy's secretary at Sebben & Sebben Worldwide.
 Dog with Bucket Hat (voiced by John Doman) – An anthropomorphic Basset Hound that wears a bucket hat who is the head of security at Sebben & Sebben Worldwide.
 Charley "Strongarm" (voiced by River L. Ramirez) – Sebben & Sebben Worldwide's head of public relations.
 Paul "The Feels" (voiced by Tony Hale) – Sebben & Sebben Worldwide's residential masseur. He is openly queer.
 Brian O'Brien (voiced by Rob Delaney) – The head of human waste at Sebben & Sebben Worldwide.
 Evie "The Big Ten" (voiced by Sonia Denis) – The daughter of one of Sebben & Sebben Worldwide's workers who is friends with the building as she can understand it. She later becomes the team's technology expert
 Jessica from Accounting (voiced by Julie Dove) - One of Sebben & Sebben Worldwide's accountants. It is revealed in "The S.I.M.M." that she keeps the building and company together.

Series overview

Episodes

Season 1 (2021)

Season 2 (2022)

Reception 
Reviewing the first 2 episodes, Den of Geek praises the "chaotic" pacing and characters, "sweet" backstory, and expresses hope in its potential; their review describes the show as an "exciting new Adult Swim venture that’s able to successfully carry on the unhinged atmosphere of the original Harvey Birdman while it takes the material to entirely different places."

The AV Club expressed joy towards Brewster's titular character and lamented that the supporting characters were not as interesting as those in Harvey Birdman, presumably because Birdman was contingent on the inclusion of Hanna-Barbera cartoon incidentals, whereas Birdgirl takes place in a human-centric world.

Notes

References

External links
 

Harvey Birdman, Attorney at Law
2021 American television series debuts
2020s American adult animated television series
2020s American animated comedy television series
2020s American sitcoms
2020s American superhero comedy television series
2020s American workplace comedy television series
Adult Swim original programming
American adult animated comedy television series
American adult animated superhero television series
American adult animated television spin-offs
American flash adult animated television series
American animated sitcoms
Animated superheroine television shows
English-language television shows
Television series by Williams Street